Yadav Malla, also known as Jadava Malla was the fourteenth king of the Mallabhum. He ruled from 906 to 919 CE.

References

Malla rulers
Kings of Mallabhum
10th-century Indian monarchs
Mallabhum